Urodidae or "false burnet moths" is a family of moths in the lepidopteran order. It is the type genus in the superfamily, Urodoidea, with three genera, one of which, Wockia, occurs in Europe.

Taxonomy and systematics
Urodidae were previously included in the superfamily Yponomeutoidea (Kyrki, 1984, 1988) and have also been lumped with Galacticidae (Heppner, 1991, 1997) or with other Sesioidea (Heppner, 1998). They belong to the lower part of the lepidopteran clade "Apoditrysia" (Dugdale et al., 1999) (i.e. not "Obtectomera"), but their closest relatives are as yet unknown and it is hoped that DNA sequencing can help resolve this question.

Urodidae was formerly the only family in the superfamily Urodoidea, but in 2020 a new family was described within Urodoidea, Ustyurtiidae.

Morphology and identification
Urodidae resemble some Zygaenidae: Procridinae at rest. These small to medium-sized moths measure 11 to 37 mm in wingspan and often have a greyish or mottled forewing background colour. The male adult has a "hairpencil" on the costa of the hindwing. In the caterpillar, the placement of the setae and structure of the prolegs is diagnostic, and the pupal segments I–II are fixed. On the head, there are no ocelli or "chaetosemata" and the proboscis even at the base is unscaled. An "epiphysis" is present on the foreleg (Dugdale et al. (1999), and for more details).

Distribution
The genera Urodus and Spiladarcha occur in the Neotropics while Wockia asperipunctella occurs in Europe and has recently been found in northern North America (Heppner, 1997; Landry, 1998) and unless this is a recent invasion the species would be a good example of a Holarctic distribution pattern.

Biology and host plants

The biology is poorly known, but the larvae can be found on various tree species including some fruit trees. The "bumelia webworm moth" (Urodus parvula) is recorded on Lauraceae: (avocado=Persea), Fagaceae (Quercus), Sapotaceae (Sideroxylon) and Erythroxylaceae: Erythroxylum. Urodus parvula has also been reared on Rutaceae (Citrus) and Malvaceae (Hibiscus). W. asperipunctella has in North America been reared from quaking aspen (Populus tremuloides) (Landry, 1998) and also Salix in Europe. The pupa is contained in an open-mesh cocoon, which can be bright orange in colour, and is sometimes suspended on a very long thread below a leaf.

Species
The following is a list of selected species:
Geoesthia ceylonica Sohn, 2014 [type locality Sri Lanka]
Spiladarcha capnodes (Walsingham, 1914) (originally in Anchimacheta)
Spiladarcha derelicta Meyrick, 1913 [type locality British Guiana]
Spiladarcha iodes (Walsingham, 1914) (originally in Anchimacheta)
Spiladarcha tolmetes (Walsingham, 1914) (originally in Anchimacheta)
Urodus amphilocha Meyrick, 1923
Urodus aphanoptis Meyrick, 1930
Urodus aphrogama Meyrick, 1936
Urodus auchmera Walsingham, 1914
Urodus brachyanches Meyrick, 1931
Urodus calligera Zeller, 1877
Urodus carabopa Meyrick, 1925
Urodus chiquita Busck, 1910
Urodus chrysoconis Meyrick, 1932
Urodus costaricae Busck, 1910
Urodus cumulata Walsingham, 1914
Urodus cyanombra Meyrick, 1913
Urodus cyclopica Meyrick, 1930
Urodus decens Meyrick, 1925
Urodus distincta Strand, 1911
Urodus favigera Meyrick, 1913
Urodus fonteboae Strand, 1911
Urodus forficulella (Walsingham, 1897) (originally in Paratiquadra)
Urodus fulminalis Meyrick, 1931
Urodus fumosa (Zeller, 1863) (originally in Trichostibas)
Urodus hephaestiella (Zeller, 1877)
Urodus hexacentris Meyrick, 1931
Urodus imitans Felder, 1875
Urodus imitata Druce, 1884
Urodus iophlebia Zeller, 1877
Urodus isoxesta Meyrick, 1932
Urodus isthmiella Busck, 1910
?Urodus lissopeda (Meyrick, 1932) (originally in Pygmocrates)
Urodus lithophaea Meyrick, 1913
Urodus marantica Walsingham, 1914
Urodus merida Strand, 1911
Urodus mirella (Möschler, 1890) (originally in Pexicnemidia)
Urodus modesta Druce, 1884
Urodus niphatma Meyrick, 1925
Urodus opticosema Meyrick, 1930
Urodus ovata Zeller, 1877
Urodus pallidicostella Walsingham, 1897
Urodus pamporphyra Meyrick, 1936
Urodus parvula Edwards, 1881
Urodus perischias Meyrick, 1925
Urodus porphyrina Meyrick, 1932
Urodus praetextata Meyrick, 1913
Urodus procridias Meyrick, 1936
Urodus pulvinata Meyrick, 1923
Urodus sanctipaulensis Strand, 1911
Urodus scythrochalca Meyrick, 1932
Urodus sordidata Zeller, 1877
Urodus spumescens Meyrick, 1925
Urodus staphylina Meyrick, 1932
Urodus subcaerulea Dognin, 1910
Urodus sympiestis Meyrick, 1925
Urodus tineiformis (Walker, 1856) (originally in Aperla)
Urodus transverseguttata Zeller, 1877
Urodus triancycla Meyrick, 1931
Urodus venatella Busck, 1910
Urodus xiphura Meyrick, 1931
Wockia asperipunctella Bruand, 1850

References

Heppner, J. (1991). Faunal regions and the diversity of Lepidoptera. Tropical Lepidoptera, 2 (Suppl. 1): 1–85.
Heppner, J. (1997). Wockia asperipunctella in North America (Lepidoptera: Urodidae: Galacticinae). Holarctic Lepidoptera, 4(2) 
Heppner, J. (1998). Classification of Lepidoptera. Part 1. Introduction. Holarctic Lepidoptera, 5 (Suppl. 1): 1–148.
Kyrki, J. (1983). Adult abdominal sternum II in ditrysian tineoid superfamilies – morphology and phylogenetic significance (Lepidoptera). Annales Entomologia Fennica, 49: 89–9
Kyrki, J. (1988). The systematic position of Wockia Heinemann, 1870 and related genera (Lepidoptera: Ditrysia: Yponomeutidae auct.). Nota lepidopterologica, 11: 45–69.
Landry, J.-F. (1998). Additional Nearctic records of Wockia aspericpunctella, with notes on its distribution and structural variation (Lepidoptera: Urodidae). Holarctic Lepidoptera, 5(3): 9–13.

Sources
Firefly Encyclopedia of Insects and Spiders, edited by Christopher O'Toole, 2002. [Vernacular name]
The systematic position of Wockia Heinemann, 1870, and related genera (Lepidoptera: Ditrysia: Yponomeutidae auct.). Nota lepidopterologica, 11(1): 53.

External links

Tree of Life
NHM Hosts Database
Fauna Europaea Experts
Wockia asperipunctella from Lepidoptera of Finland
Moth Photographer's Group

Urodus parvula voucher
Barcoding progress
Nuclear gene sequencing progress

 
Moth families